Chinnapuram is a village in Krishna district of the Indian state of Andhra Pradesh. It is located in Machilipatnam mandal of Machilipatnam revenue division. It is 11 km from Machilipatnam, the district headquarters.

Geography 

The climate is tropical, with hot summers and moderate winters. The average warmest month is May.On average, the coolest month is January. The maximum average precipitation occurs in August. The peak temperature reaches 37 °C (99 °F) in May–June, while the winter temperature is 19-28 C.

See also 
 List of villages in Krishna district

References 

Villages in Krishna district